Erez Mesika (born 1979) is a retired Israeli professional football (soccer) player who is of a Tunisian-Jewish descent. Mesika played on the left side of the midfield and has spent the bulk of his career with Maccabi Tel Aviv. There he enjoyed some of his greatest professional achievements including qualifying for the UEFA Champions League.

At the end of his contract with Maccabi Tel Aviv at 2008 he decided to move to Cypriot AEK Larnaca where he signed a one-year deal. After his contract ended at the summer of 2009 he had signed at the newly promoted former Israeli Champions Hapoel Be'er Sheva but unfortunately was sidelined early in the season because of heart problem that later caused him to announce his retirement from professional football career at the age of 30 .

Honours

With Maccabi Tel Aviv
 State Cup: 2004/05

References

Footnotes

1979 births
Living people
Israeli Jews
Israeli footballers
Association football midfielders
Hapoel Tel Aviv F.C. players
Maccabi Netanya F.C. players
Hapoel Haifa F.C. players
Maccabi Tel Aviv F.C. players
Hapoel Be'er Sheva F.C. players
AEK Larnaca FC players
Israeli expatriate footballers
Expatriate footballers in Cyprus
Israeli expatriate sportspeople in Cyprus
People from Pardes Hanna-Karkur
Liga Leumit players
Israeli Premier League players
Cypriot First Division players
Israeli people of Tunisian-Jewish descent